Fatin "10" Horton, professionally known mononymously as Fatin or by his stage name 10 for the Triad (or simply 10), is an American North Carolina-based record producer affiliated with 9th Wonder's It's a Wonderful World Music Group and a member of the Soul Council production collective. He has produced songs for the likes of KRS-One, Skyzoo, Lloyd Banks, Heltah Skeltah, Jean Grae, Pharoahe Monch, Phonte, Torae and Sean Boog among others. In 2007 Horton provided additional music to the second season of adult animated sitcom The Boondocks, and in 2014 he was a contributing music producer on the second season of adult animated sitcom Black Dynamite.

Production discography

See also
It's a Wonderful World Music Group discography

References

External links

Hip hop discographies
Production discographies
American hip hop record producers
People from Greensboro, North Carolina